John Frederick Schwaller is an American historian of Latin America, specializing in colonial Mexico, religion, and indigenous peoples.  He has written monographs on religion in Mexico, edited scholarly editions of important colonial Mexican texts, and has coordinated and edited anthologies of articles on religion.  His administrative service includes being President of State University of New York at Potsdam from 2006-2013 and Director of the Academy of American Franciscan History, 1993-95. He is currently professor of history at University of Albany, State University of New York.

Education and career
Schwaller was born and brought up in Hays, Kansas, but he spent considerable time in Mexico as a youth, travelling with his parents.  He attended Grinnell College, graduating with a B.A. in History. He attended graduate school in Spanish at University of Kansas, in Lawrence, earning an M.A. in Spanish, and went on to Indiana University in Bloomington, earning a doctorate in History. As a graduate student he spent two years doing research in Mexico and Spain, supported by fellowships.

He taught at Florida Atlantic University from 1979–93, with a joint appointment in History and Languages & Linguistics. He went on to serve as an administrator and faculty member at University of Montana, and University of Minnesota, Morris, and in 2006 became President of SUNY Potsdam.  In 2013, he stepped down from administration and returned to full-time teaching at SUNY Albany.

He has been active in promoting connections between scholars through the H-Net listservs for Latin America (H-LATAM) and Nahuatl (H-Nahuatl). He serves on the editorial boards of The Americas and Estudios de Cultura Náhuatl.

Works

Monographs
2019 The Fifteenth Month Aztec History in the Rituals of Panquetzaliztli. University of Oklahoma Press. 
2011 The History of the Catholic Church in Latin America. New York University Press. 
1990 Origenes de la riqueza de la Iglesia en México. Fondo de  Cultura Económica. 
1987  The Church and Clergy in Sixteenth-Century Mexico. Albuquerque: University of New Mexico Press.  
1985  Origins of Church Wealth in Mexico: Ecclesiastical Finances and Church Revenues, 1523-1600. Albuquerque: University of New Mexico Press. 
1981  Partidos y párrocos bajo la real corona en la Nueva España, siglo XVI. Mexico: Instituto Nacional de Antropología e Historia.

Scholarly editions
2014 The First Letter from New Spain: The Lost Petition of Cortés and His Company, June 20, 1519, with Helen Nader, University of Texas Press. 
1999  A Guide to Confession Large and Small in the Mexican Language (1634). Norman: University of Oklahoma Press.  With Barry Sell.

Edited works
2005  Francis in the Americas: Essays on the Franciscan Family in North and South America. Berkeley: Academy of American Franciscan History (editor)
2003  Sahagún at 500: Essays on the Quincentenary of the Birth of Fr. Bernardino de Sahagún, OFM. Berkeley: Academy of American Franciscan History (editor and contributor). 
2000  The Church in Colonial Hispanic America: A Reader. Wilmington, DE: Scholarly Resources (editor).

Reference works
2001 Nahuatl Manuscripts in Repositories in the United States. Berkeley: Academy of American Franciscan History.

Honors
Doctor of Humane Letters, honoris causa – Grinnell College, 2009

References

External links
 Biography
 Curriculum Vitae
 Editor H-LATAM
 Editor H-Nahuatl
 Member, Editorial board, The Americas
 Member, Editorial board, ‘’Estudios de Cultura Náhuatl

Living people
21st-century American historians
21st-century American male writers
Historians of Latin America
Historians of Mexico
Historians of Mesoamerica
American Mesoamericanists
Historians of Franciscan history
Grinnell College alumni
Indiana University alumni
Florida Atlantic University faculty
University of Montana faculty
State University of New York at Potsdam faculty
University at Albany, SUNY faculty
Year of birth missing (living people)
American male non-fiction writers